A by-elections to the French National Assembly was held in French Sudan on 8 July 1956 following the death of Mamadou Konaté of the Sudanese Union – African Democratic Rally (US−RDA), one of the territory's four MPs. US−RDA candidate Baréma Bocoum was elected.

Results

References

By-elections to the National Assembly (France)
1956 in French Sudan
Elections in Mali
French Sudan
French Sudan
July 1956 events in Africa